Kushk-e Olya (also Romanized as Kūshk-e ‘Olyā; also known as Kawaishk, Keveshk Bālā, Keveshk-e Bālā, Khūīshk, Kūshk, Kūshkak, and Kūshk-e Bālā) is a village in Dasht-e Rum Rural District, in the Central District of Boyer-Ahmad County, Kohgiluyeh and Boyer-Ahmad Province, Iran. At the 2006 census, its population was 600, in 123 families.

References 

Populated places in Boyer-Ahmad County